Mohammed Gholam (born February 19, 1978) is a retired Qatari footballer. He currently serves as the sporting director of his lifelong club, Al Sadd.

Club career

Mohammed spent his entire club career at Al-Sadd, starting from the youth setup in 1986, before breaking in to the first team in 1997.

The youngster went on to establish himself in the first team by the turn of the millennium, at a time in which another golden era began for the club. He went on to win numerous titles in a short span, which included the Qatari league shield after a 11-year gap, in addition to the club's first triumph at the Arab Club Champions Cup in 2001. 

In 2003, Mohammed had the honour of scoring in two finals, as Al-Sadd went on to win the domestic cup double by winning the Heir Apparent Cup and the Amir Cup.

Quadruple

The biggest achievement of that era came in the 2006-07, when Al-Sadd completed the domestic quadruple, winning all the titles on offer: Sheikh Jassim Cup, Qatar Stars League, Heir Apparent Cup, and Amir Cup. Mohammed captained the team for a significant part of the season, including the latter two cup finals.

After lifting the Amir Cup title following a shootout victory over Al-Khor in the season-ending final, he said: "The success we have achieved this season was not a coincidence, but the result of a well-planned and executed strategy by the players and management over the entire season. The hard work and determination of everyone involved have led us to this historic day that will be cherished in the memories of the players, staff, and fans."

Testimonial

On January 10, 2012, Al Sadd played Bundesliga side FC Schalke 04 in a testimonial friendly held in commemoration of Mohammed Gholam's career. A few former players flew in for the match, such as Felipe Jorge, who scored the winning goal the team. Coincidentally, Mohammed scored Al Sadd's only goal against A.C. Milan in a 2–1 defeat in a farewell match for former club legend Jafal Rashed Al-Kuwari in 2009.

International career

Mohammed's international career for Qatar started with the U23s before moving on to the senior national team. He went on to appear in three AFC Asian Cup tournaments for Al-Annabi. 

During his Asian Cup debut in 2000, at the 12th edition in Lebanon, Mohammed was given a start in the opening group stage game against Uzbekistan, and he scored his first international goal in the 60th minute. The game finished 1-1, after Mirjalol Qosimov equalised for Uzbekistan. Mohammed went on to start in the remaining two group games, against Saudi Arabia and Japan, both of which also ended in draws. Qatar qualified for the knockout stage of the competition for the first time as one of the best third-placed teams, and faced China in the quarterfinals. Mohammed started once again but Al-Annabi crashed out after a 3-1 defeat.

Honours

Club
Al Sadd
Qatar Stars League: 4
Emir of Qatar Cup: 5
Heir Apparent Cup: 4
QFA Cup: 1
Joint Tournament: 1
Arab Champions League: 1

Honours
The best football player (2002-2003)
The Falcon Sports Magazine Football Player (2002-2003)
Al Sadd Sports Club Player of the Year (1999-2000)
Best Asian player of the month May-2003

Goals for Senior National Team

References

External links 
Rich tributes to Gholam - DohaStadium plus 
Perfect farewell  - DohaStadium plus 
- Stad Doha 
Qatar Football

 
Player profile – footballdatabase.eu

1978 births
Living people
Qatari footballers
Qatar international footballers
2000 AFC Asian Cup players
2004 AFC Asian Cup players
2007 AFC Asian Cup players
Footballers at the 2002 Asian Games
Qatari people of Baloch descent
Al Sadd SC players
Qatar Stars League players
Association football midfielders
Asian Games competitors for Qatar